Alto Parnaíba is a Brazilian municipality in the southernmost tip of the state of Maranhão. In 2020, the city's population was 11,212.

The municipality contains part of the  Nascentes do Rio Parnaíba National Park, created in 2002.

References 

Municipalities in Maranhão
Populated places established in 1866
1866 establishments in Brazil